Giləzi is a village in the Siazan Rayon of Azerbaijan.

References 

Populated places in Siyazan District